Almira Mae Taylor Nystrom (August 11, 1871 - December 8, 1959) was a Utah suffragist and a member of the general presidency of what is today the Young Women organization of the Church of Jesus Christ of Latter-day Saints (LDS Church).

Mae Taylor was born in Salt Lake City, Utah Territory, to George Hamilton and Elmina Shepard Taylor, the first president of the church's Young Women organization. She attended the University of Utah for a year, but completed her course of study at LDS College and married Theodore Nystrom on 21 June 1900. They lived in Montpelier, Idaho, for two years.

In 1892, Nystrom had become a member of the general board of what was then called the Young Women's Mutual Improvement Association. She became its corresponding secretary in 1904, and then its treasurer. She continued in this position until 5 April 1905, when she was chosen by new president Martha H. Tingey as the second counselor in the organization. Nystrom was a counselor to Tingey until she was released on 15 July 1923 because of her move to Green River, Wyoming. She was succeeded in her position by Lucy Grant Cannon. Nystrom returned to live in Salt Lake City in 1929.

Nystrom was a member of Susan B. Anthony's National Council of Women and was a delegate from Utah for to the suffragist organization's conventions in 1908 and 1909.

Publications
Nystrom, Mae Taylor "The Y.L.M.I.A. under President Elmina S. Taylor," Young Woman's Journal 36 (June 1925): 330.

Notes

References
 
Encyclopedia of Mormonism, app. 1, ""Biographical Register of General Church Officers"

External links

1871 births
1959 deaths
American leaders of the Church of Jesus Christ of Latter-day Saints
American suffragists
Burials at Salt Lake City Cemetery
Counselors in the General Presidency of the Young Women (organization)
Latter Day Saints from Idaho
Latter Day Saints from Utah
Mormon feminists
People from Green River, Wyoming
People from Montpelier, Idaho
People from Salt Lake City
University of Utah alumni